Zork Nemesis: The Forbidden Lands is a graphic adventure game developed by Zombie LLC, published by Activision, and released in 1996 for Windows 95, MS-DOS, and Macintosh. It is the eleventh game in the Zork series, and the first title not to be marketed under the Infocom label, while featuring a darker, less comical story within the Zork setting. The story focuses on players investigating the sudden disappearance of four prominent figures and their children to the hands of a mysterious being known as the "Nemesis", and uncovering a sinister plot during their investigations that they must thwart. The game features performances by Lauren Koslow, W. Morgan Sheppard, Allan Kolman, Stephen Macht, Paul Anthony Stewart, Merle Kennedy, and Bruce Nozick.

The game received favorable reviews, despite some criticism of the puzzles and lack of relevance to the Zork setting, and won the 1996 Spotlight Award for "Best Prerendered Art". The MS-DOS edition of the game was later released by GOG on their website, who made it compatible for use with Windows XP, Windows Vista, Windows 7, Windows 8, and Windows 10.

Gameplay
Zork Nemesis operates from a first-person perspective and uses a simple point-and-click system. The cursor fundamentally allows for interaction with the player's surrounding, changing to symbolize what can be done; an arrow going forward or back allows for movement; arrows for side-to-side or up-and-down allow for examining locations from different viewpoints; a gold arrow allows for interaction with objects; and a hand icon allows for objects to be picked up or to symbolize where objects can be used. Each location, ranging from corridors, small rooms, and vast halls, can be viewed in panoramic 360-degree to find objects to examine and interact with, with a still screen used when zooming in to examine an object in more detail (i.e. a book). Items collected by the player are stored in a simple inventory that be cycled through the right mouse-button.

Puzzles in the game generally require the player to find clues that will help them solve it, ranging from finding certain objects or triggering something in the right combination; a score system mostly denotes when a player has completed a section of the game's story.

Story

Setting
The game takes place in the fantasy world of Zork, with players initially solving puzzles and exploring the Temple of Agrippa, a large complex situated in a mountainous region within the Forbidden Lands. Later the player has the ability to travel and explore the following locations: Frigid River Branch Conservatory - a musical school and performance hall near to Flood Control Dam #7; Steppinthrax Monastery – an abandoned monastery in disrepair; Grey Mountains Asylum – a mental institution in the frigid, frozen peaks of the Grey Mountains; Castle Irondune - a military fort with private museum of battles, situated in the Irondune desert.

Characters
 Madame Sophia Hamilton (portrayed by Lauren Koslow) - An alchemist of water and copper, and head of the Frigid River Branch Conservatory, who teaches music to Alexandria.
 Bishop Francois Malveaux (portrayed by W. Morgan Sheppard) - An alchemist of fire and lead, father of Alexandria, and a religious man who runs the Steppinthrax Monastery. 
 Doctor Erasmus Sartorius (portrayed by Allan Kolman) - An alchemist of air and tin, and a doctor who is head of the Grey Mountains Asylum. Separated Alexandria from her birth mother during her infancy.
 General Thaddeus Kaine (portrayed by Stephen Macht) - An alchemist of earth and iron, father of Lucien, and a decorated officer in charge of Castle Irondune. Responsible for separating his son from marrying Alexandria.
 Lucien Kaine (portrayed by Paul Anthony Stewart) - Thaddeus' son and a skilled soldier. Despises his father's actions while growing affectionate for Alexandria, before being arrested for desertion when planning to marry her.
 Alexandria Wolfe (portrayed by Merle Kennedy) - A young woman born at the Grey Mountains Asylum, raised by Francois with no knowledge of her real parents, taught music by Sophia, and fell in love with Lucien while performing concerts. Died a mysterious death in the Temple of Agrippa.
 "Nemesis" (voiced by Bruce Nozick; portrayed by Paul Anthony Stewart) - A mysterious entity that took over the Temple of Agrippa, torturing Sophia, Malveaux, Sartorius and Kaine after entrapping them. The Nemesis seeks to find the fifth alchemical element so that it can grant it what it desires, and sees the player as nothing more than a problem.
 The Player - A nameless adventurer, charged by Vice Regent Syovar the Strong to enter the Forbidden Lands and investigate the disappearance of four prominent citizens, replacing a previous agent named Karlok Bivotar who disappeared on the same mission.

Plot
Following the demise of Agent L. Bivotar, Vice Regent Syovar the Strong assigns the player with the task of continuing their investigations within the region known as the Forbidden Lands, in which Bivotar had been instructed to discover what had happened to four prominent figures of the Empire who went missing – Doctor Erasmus Sartorius, General Thaddeus Kaine, Bishop Francois Malveaux, and Madame Sophia Hamilton - while determining if rumours of a mysterious curse that had emerged from within the region were substantiated, and investigate possible illegal magic being conducted. Travelling to the Temple of Agrippa, an ancient temple within the Eastlands that Bivotar had learnt about during their investigations, the player uncovers a message left behind by the spirit of Alexandria Wolfe, a young woman who seeks help to deal with a great evil that resides within the temple.

Entering the main building of the temple, the player uncovers information revealing that Sartorius, Kaine, Malveaux and Sophia were operating in secret as alchemists, each mastering one of the four elements: Air, Fire, Earth, and Water. The group had been seeking the mysterious fifth element called "the Quintessence" - , until a mysterious entity known as the Nemesis killed them. After finding each member's corresponding element, the group explain that Nemesis not only killed them but also Alexandria, Francois' daughter, and Thaddeus' son Lucien. Using their combined power, the group stop Nemesis from attacking the player, and advises them to visit their homes and seek out the elemental metals aligned to each of them. Using a special planetarium, the player travels to each member's home – Steppinthrax Monastery, Castle Irondune, Grey Mountains Asylum, and Frigid River Branch Conservatory – and find the pure samples of each metal within each alchemist's personal laboratory.

Whilst in each of these locations, the player slowly learns more about the Alchemists' work and the identity of the Nemesis, through visions and various letters. The player learns that Sartorius sought to complete the research of his father into the Quintessence which could grant eternal life. Learning that it required mastery of the four elements and their pure metals, both of which he could not accomplish on his own, Sartorius recruited the assistance of Sophia, Francois and Thaddeus, each for their own reasons: Francois sought to avoid his death from an incurable disease; Thaddeus sought power to win a war against a rival; and Sophia sought to live forever, having fallen in love with Thaddeus. The group soon learned that they needed to create a child, who had to be born when an alignment of planets, each corresponding to each alchemical element, occurred at the same time of a solar eclipse, who would lead them to finding the fifth element.

Sartorius sourced the child, Alexandria, from one of his patients at his asylum, and left Francois in charge of raising her. Alexandria was taught a special song by Sophia, unaware it would purify her soul for a ritual the group would perform on her. However, the alchemists had not foreseen Lucien falling in love with Alexandria when he attended one of her concerts, thus Thaddeus had him arrested on a false charge of draft-dodging. Knowing the fifth element would be theirs at the next solar eclipse, the group lured Alexandria to the Agrippa Temple for sacrifice. Lucien, learning of their plan, escaped from his cell, but arrived too late to save Alexandria. Angered, Lucien killed the group in revenge, and became the Nemesis in order to find the fifth element himself, and revive Alexandria with it. When the player returns, having revived the group, the alchemists attempt to convince them to drink from a chalice, but seeing them not willing, chose to send them away, while resuming their ritual.

Lucien, knowing they must not find Alexandria's body, beseeches the player for help since they know the truth, and passes on a gold ring. Entering a hidden chamber below the temple, the player creates a special Alchemy symbol, representing Infinity, from both Lucien's and Alexandria's rings. With the rings now purified and imbued with the fifth element, representing pure love, the player quickly uses it to stop the Alchemists. The resulting power from the fifth element kills them, revives Alexandria, and destroys the temple. This ends the curse in the Forbidden Lands, and the game ends with Lucien and Alexandria walking away together to live in peace.

Production
Zork Nemesis employed technology Activision dubbed "Z-Vision Surround Technology," which gives users a simulated 360-degree view of each location visited. It was one of the first games to employ such technology, though Zork Nemesis only allows panning in either horizontal or vertical where both panning options are available, unlike in later games such as The Journeyman Project 3: Legacy of Time or Myst III: Exile. Furthermore, details were far more difficult to make out in the panoramic scenes than in the still screens; the sequel, Zork: Grand Inquisitor, made significant improvements to the Z-Vision system. Technical director Laird Malamed felt the game suffered from time constraints, saying that once the advanced game engine was completed, the team didn't have enough time left to implement anything more than simple control panel puzzles.

Like other adventure games of its time, Zork Nemesis made use of live actors. The game features a significant amount of screen-time for the actors, thanks to its use of flashbacks at key locations (or objects) and the use of monologues in which characters address the player explaining and justifying their actions.

The game's plot was written by Cecilia Barajas, Nick Sagan and Adam Simon and is a departure from the series usual comedic treatment in its games, by featuring a much darker and less humorous story than previous games. The budget of Zork Nemesis surpassed $3 million. The live-action scenes contributed to this cost, which ultimately rose to around USD$3.5 million. The game was heavily marketed, with an estimated $1 million spent on this aspect.

Reception

The game received "favorable" reviews according to the review aggregation website GameRankings. Next Generation said, "With 3D sound and stunning graphics (the game is almost worth the price just to examine the fantastic architectural environments), this game was destined for five stars, until the puzzles – and these are what really count, to us, anyway – dragged the game back down."

Zork Nemesis placed 10th on PC Datas monthly computer game sales chart for April 1996. It secured positions 12 and 11 the following two months, respectively. By November 1996, Zork Nemesis had sold above 100,000 units. According to Activision, strong sales of the game during the 1996 holiday shopping season contributed to high revenues in the company's third quarter, which increased 78% over the third quarter of 1995.

Zork Nemesis won the 1996 Spotlight Award for "Best Prerendered Art" from the Game Developers Conference. It was also nominated for the 1996 "Adventure Game of the Year" awards of Computer Games Strategy Plus, PC Gamer, CNET Gamecenter and Computer Game Entertainment, but these went variously to The Neverhood, The Beast Within: A Gabriel Knight Mystery and The Pandora Directive. PC Gamer highlighted Nemesiss "charm and vitality", and called it "graphically gorgeous".

In 2011, Adventure Gamers named Zork Nemesis the 51st-best adventure game ever released.

See also
The Space Bar

References

External links
 
 Zork Nemesis review at Adventure Classic Gaming

1996 video games
Activision games
Classic Mac OS games
First-person adventure games
Games commercially released with DOSBox
Point-and-click adventure games
ScummVM-supported games
Video games scored by Mark Morgan
Windows games
Zombie Studios games
Zork
Video games developed in the United States